Denis Gremelmayr was the defending champion. Vincent Millot defeated him in the second round.
Rui Machado won the final 6–3, 6–3, against Jerzy Janowicz.

Seeds

Draw

Finals

Top half

Bottom half

External Links
 Main Draw
 Qualifying Draw

Poznan Porsche Open - Singles
2011 Singles